A balloon fetish is a sexual fetish that involves balloons. A balloon fetishist is also referred to as a "looner". Some balloon fetishists "revel in the popping of balloons and [others] may become anxious and tearful at the very thought of popping balloons". Others enjoy blowing up balloons or deflating them.

See also
 Body inflation
 Inflatable doll
 Latex and PVC fetishism
 Bubble dance

References

Balloons (entertainment)
Sexual fetishism